Newcastle is a village in County Tipperary, Ireland. Located close to the border with County Waterford, it is in the barony of Iffa and Offa West. The River Suir runs past the village. Newcastle is located 17 kilometres from Clonmel, the county town of County Tipperary.

The remains of an Anglo-Norman castle (tower house) and medieval church are located near the village.

Newcastle is the birthplace of Rev. Dr. Robert MacCarthy, Dean of St. Patrick's Cathedral, Dublin (1999-2012). Politician Mattie McGrath is also from the area.

References

External links
Newcastle Industry Profile
Pilgrimage in Medieval Ireland
Historic Graves
Newcastle Community Website

Towns and villages in County Tipperary